Omnitrans, stylized as "OmniTrans," is a public transportation agency in San Bernardino County, California, United States. The largest transit operator within San Bernardino County, it serves the San Bernardino Valley. The agency was established in 1976 through a joint powers agreement and today includes 15 cities and portions of the unincorporated areas of San Bernardino County. In addition to the southwestern corner of San Bernardino County, Omnitrans provides service to parts of Riverside and Los Angeles Counties. Omnitrans currently carries about 11 million passengers per year. Omnitrans currently operates fixed route bus service, bus rapid transit and a paratransit service for the disabled, “Access.”  Omnitrans operates throughout the urbanized area of southwestern San Bernardino County: south of the San Bernardino Mountains, from Upland, Montclair, and Chino in the west to Redlands, California and Yucaipa in the east.

History 
In October 2019, Omnitrans faced increasing deficits and reduced service. They plan to cut service by 11 percent.
They were the operator for the Arrow commuter rail line between San Bernardino and Redlands. the San Bernardino County Transportation Authority Transit Committee voted to transfer the operation and construction duties to the Southern California Regional Rail Authority.

The Transit Committee, announced that it would launch a study considering “complete consolidation” of Omnitrans under the SBCTA due to a $520 million fiscal deficit over the next 20 years. However, in 2021, SBCTA decided against the consolidation of omnitrans due to a study that it commissioned. That indicated, that due to state law, SBCTA was required to pay off the agency’s unfunded pension liability, at a one-time cost of between $100 million to $174 million. Instead SBCTA opted to provide $100 million to Omnitrans to keep it viable through 2040

Former Services

OmniLink 
Omnitrans formerly operated OmniLink, a demand-response service that operated in Yucaipa and Chino Hills. OmniLink ceased operation 29 August 2014.

Future 
On February 27, 2020 it was announced that Omnitrans placed a new order for four forty-foot, battery-electric Xcelsior CHARGE™ heavy-duty transit buses.

Services

Fixed route 
The fixed-route services consist of 28 local fixed routes including one peak-hour only service, two peak-hour trippers, and one regional express route. Routes are operated with  buses (and 12  buses) running primarily along major east-west and north-south corridors. Headways vary from 15-minute to hourly service, with approximately 18 hours of service on weekdays, 13 hours on Saturdays, and 12 hours on Sundays. Omnitrans recently had major changes in the West Valley by adjusting routes to run more North to South (80s) and East to West (60s).

Bus rapid transit 
Omnitrans developed a bus rapid transit route titled sbX that traverses the San Bernardino Valley from north to south.

OmniGo 
OmniGo is a general-public circular fixed route service for the low density/low demand cities of Chino Hills, Yucaipa, and Grand Terrace.

Omni Ride 
Omni Ride is arriving soon to Bloomington, Chino, Chino Hills, Grand Terrace, Highgrove, Redlands and Yucaipa.

Arrow Commuter Rail 
Arrow Commuter Rail is starting October 24, 2022 is between San Bernardino Transit Center and Redlands.

Demand response

Access ADA Service 
Access provides public transportation services for persons who are physically or cognitively unable to use regular bus service (ADA certified and/or Omnitrans Disability Identification Card holders). Access operates curb to- curb service with minibuses or vans, complementing the Omnitrans fixed-route bus system. Service is available on the same days and at the same times that fixed-route services operate.

Routes

References

External links 

Bus transportation in California
Public transportation in San Bernardino County, California
Public transportation in Riverside County, California
Public transportation in Los Angeles County, California
Transit authorities with natural gas buses
Transportation in San Bernardino, California
Transit agencies in California